Matthew Arneborg (born July 15, 1970, in Road Town, Tortola, British Virgin Islands) is a windsurfer who competed in the Summer Olympics for the British Virgin Islands.

Arneborg was just seventeen years old when he competed in the windsurfing class at the 1988 Summer Olympics, after seven races he finished 29th out of 45 starters.

References

Olympic sailors of the British Virgin Islands
British Virgin Islands male sailors (sport)
Sailors at the 1988 Summer Olympics – Division II
Living people
1970 births
British Virgin Islands windsurfers